Asrestar is a class of demons in Manichaeism. They appear prominently in the Manichaean creation myth, especially the creation of mankind. Accordingly, Az decided to create humans in the image of the Third Messenger and mingled the demonic asrestar with the light particles, that is basically the soul. Although most asrestar are indistinguishable, an eminent demon called Šaklūn, features as demiurgic demon entrapping humans in the material world during the Adam and Eve narration. Human's urges for evil, such as lying, are remaining parts of the asrestar within the body.

See also
Ur (Mandaeism)

References

Manichaeism
Demons in Gnosticism